The Maule Region is one of Chile's 16 first order administrative divisions. Its capital is Talca. The region derives its name from the Maule River which, running westward from the Andes, bisects the region and spans a basin of about 20,600 km2. The Maule river is of considerable historic interest because, among other reasons, it marked the southern limits of the Inca Empire.

Geography and ecology

There are a number of flora and fauna species present in Maule. For example, the endangered Chilean Wine Palm (Jubaea chilensis) is found in a very limited distribution that includes the Maule Region. The limited distribution Nothofagus alessandri is also found in the region.

Demography

According to the 2017 census, the population of the region was 1,033,197. With one third of its population living in rural areas, Maule has a greater proportion of rural inhabitants than any other region of Chile. Its most populated city is the regional capital, Talca, with 235,000 inhabitants, followed by Curicó (120,700) and Linares (127,000). Other important cities are: Constitución (50,914), Parral (47,000), Cauquenes (43,000), Molina (42,000) and San Javier (40,000).

Population density
The average density of the Maule Region is 34.1 inhabitants per km2, with less dense areas towards the mountains, and dense areas in the central valley.

Composition by age and sex
According to the composition pyramid of the population of the Region, those younger than fifteen years old are becoming greater in number than the adult population.  The annual growth rate of the population of the Maule Region is 1.06%; this comparatively low figure arises from the low birth rate in the Region.  The average life expectancy in the Region is 76.3 years.

Economy

Forestry and agriculture, led by wine grape plantations, are the main economic activities. The Maule region is Chile's leading wine-making region, producing 50% of all the country's fine export wines, and a number of the largest vineyards are located here. Owing to its high concentration of vineyards, the Curicó Valley, which means "black water" in Mapudungun, is considered the core of Chile's wine industry. Wine-making is a traditional activity, some vineyards dating back to 1830. The increased wine-growing area is matched by the development of the industry's infrastructure, technology, and equipment.

In addition to wine, two export-oriented agricultural items have emerged dynamically: fruit, vegetables and flowers.

Electricity, gas and water are the second most important economic activity. The Maule River feeds five hydroelectric power plants, including the Colbún-Machicura complex.

Political divisions
The 4 provinces of the Maule Region are divided into 30 communes.

History

Heritage
The Maule Region has produced a remarkable number of famous men and women, in particular writers and poets but also, statesmen and presidents, scientists and naturalists, churchmen, musicians and folklorists, journalists and historians. Thus, the Maule river, the long and wide artery that runs through the region, has been considered Chile's literary river par excellence. Many novels and short stories have had the river as their main background or protagonist. Several anthologies, author's dictionaries and essays have given their account of the cultural wealth of the region.

The region boasts of many small towns and villages with well-preserved colonial rural architecture, both in the religious as well as the civil fields. The Talca and Linares dioceses (the two Roman  Catholic dioceses in the Maule region) have several parish churches of particular beauty and architectural and historic value.

27 February 2010 earthquake and aftermath

The earthquake lasted nearly four minutes, severely affected the region through its action and the resultant tsunami. Cauquenes was damaged by the earthquake. Constitución was damaged by the earthquake and subsequent tsunami. Restoring power in both cities in the immediate aftermath was impossible because of damage from the tsunami.

Politics

Regional Intendant (Intendente) 
 Rodrigo Galilea Vial

Provincial Governors
 Curicó Province: Gloria Rojas
 Talca Province: María Elena Villagrán
 Linares Province: Luis Suazo
 Cauquenes Province: María Angélica Sáez

Members of Parliament (Diputados)

The Maule Region is divided into five parliamentary districts. Each one of these returns two members of parliament or deputies.

The table shows the district number, the municipalities encompassed in each district and the names (and party) of the respective members of parliament.

Senators (Senadores)

The Maule Region is divided into two senatorial circumscriptions. One (Circumscription North) is composed of the provinces of Curicó and Talca and the other by the provinces of Linares and Cauquenes. Thus, senatorial circumscription North encompasses parliamentary districts 36, 37 and 38, and senatorial circumscription South encompasses parliamentary districts 39 and 40. Each circumscription elects two senators.

The table shows the circumscription name, the municipalities encompassed in each district and the names (and party) of the respective senators.

Gallery

See also
Ranked list of Chilean regions
Founding of Talca
Juan de la Cruz y Bernardotte
Juan Albano Pereira Márquez

References

Citations

Sources
 C. Michael Hogan (2008) Chilean Wine Palm: Jubaea chilensis, GlobalTwitcher.com, ed. Nicklas Stromberg
 Julian Evans. 2001. The Forests Handbook: Applying forest science for sustainable management. 816 pages

External links
Gobierno Regional del Maule Official website 

 
Regions of Chile